The Five Doctors is a special feature-length episode of the British science fiction television series Doctor Who, produced in celebration of the programme's 20th anniversary. It had its world premiere in the United States, on the Chicago PBS station WTTW and various other PBS member stations on 23 November 1983, the anniversary date. It was transmitted in the United Kingdom two days later.

The Five Doctors was written by Terrance Dicks, who had been the script editor for the entirety of the Third Doctor's era and had written for the series since the 1960s. The episode aired after the conclusion of the 20th season to celebrate the 20th anniversary. Patrick Troughton and Jon Pertwee reprised their roles as the Second and Third Doctors, respectively. Richard Hurndall portrayed the First Doctor, as the character's original actor, William Hartnell, had died since his last appearance on the show ten years previously. Since Tom Baker decided not to appear in the special, footage from the unfinished serial Shada was used to portray the Fourth Doctor.

Plot
An unknown entity uses the Time Scoop to bring several of the previous incarnations of the Doctor; his former companions Susan Foreman, Sarah Jane Smith, and Brigadier Lethbridge-Stewart; and his enemies the Daleks, the Cybermen, a Raston Warrior Robot and a Yeti, from their respective time streams into the Death Zone on Gallifrey. The entity's attempt to grab the Fourth Doctor and Romana ends up trapping the two in the time vortex. The Fifth Doctor senses the disruption of his own timeline, and with his own companions Tegan and Turlough, travels to Gallifrey via his TARDIS, also ending up in the Death Zone, unable to travel farther with the TARDIS due to a force field projected by the Tomb of Rassilon, the tower at the centre of the Death Zone. The various Doctors lead their companions towards the Tower while avoiding the hostile forces.

At the Citadel on Gallifrey, the High Council of Time Lords have also detected the disturbance in the Doctor's timeline and the power drain from the Time Scoop, and Lord President Borusa has the Master, the Doctor's arch-nemesis, summoned to help rescue the Doctor, offering the Master a new set of regenerations and a pardon for his misdeeds if he succeeds. The Master accepts, and is given a recall device by the Castellan and a copy of the High Council's seal before he is transmatted to the Zone. The Master encounters the Third Doctor, who dismisses him and accuses him of making the seal himself, before finding the Fifth just as they are surrounded by Cybermen. The Master is knocked out by a Cyberman's gun firing, and the Doctor finds and uses the recall device to return to the Citadel. When the Master awakes, he makes a pact with the Cybermen to lead them to the Tower if they will give him his life but tricks them into falling for the Death Zone's traps. The Cybermen, too, have an ulterior motive, planning to kill the Master when he outlives his usefulness.

As the other Doctors and companions converge on the Tower, the Fifth Doctor works with the Council, discovering the recall device given to the Master included a tracking signal to lead the Cybermen to him, and foul play is suspected. The Castellan is found to possess the forbidden Black Scrolls of Rassilon, and he dies while attempting to escape an invasive mind probe. When the Doctor returns to the High Council's chamber to report, he finds Borusa missing, and soon discovers a secret room with Borusa at the controls of the Time Scoop. Borusa reveals he seeks to be the President Eternal of Gallifrey and needed the Doctors to disable the force field over the Tomb in order to gain immortality from Rassilon's Ring and rule forever. Borusa uses his headgear, the Coronet of Rassilon, to compel the Doctor to do his bidding. Meanwhile, the Master meets the First Doctor and Tegan and rids himself of the Cybermen by letting them fall victim to a giant chessboard rigged with a laser trap, before killing the Cyberleader with one of his subordinates' guns.

As Borusa expected, the other three Doctors and their companions have made it to the tomb chamber, bypassing the Yeti and Raston Warrior Robot, as well as phantoms of the Doctor's former companions Jamie McCrimmon, Zoe Heriot, Liz Shaw and Mike Yates. They ponder the meaning of writing in the tomb: "to lose is to win and he who wins shall lose". The Master arrives in the Tomb, but the Doctors' companions tie him up, with the Brigadier knocking him out for good measure. The Doctors disable the force field to summon the TARDIS, the Third Doctor using his catchphrase of "I've reversed the polarity of the neutron flow", but this action allows Borusa and the Fifth Doctor to arrive via transmat. Borusa uses the Coronet to prevent the Doctors' companions from interfering while he speaks to Rassilon. An image of Rassilon appears above the tomb and offers Borusa his ring as the key to immortality. The other Doctors try to stop Borusa, but the First Doctor tells them to hold off. Borusa dons the Ring, but then shortly disappears, becoming living stone that is part of Rassilon's tomb. The First Doctor realised what fate the tomb's writing foretold: immortality, but at a cost of perpetual incarceration.

Rassilon frees the Fourth Doctor and Romana from the time vortex and returns the Master to his own time; the Doctors immediately refuse his offer for immortality. The First, Second and Third Doctors collect their respective companions and return to their time streams as well, leaving the Fifth Doctor with Tegan and Turlough. Chancellor Flavia arrives via transmat, with the Chancellery Guard, and, after learning of Borusa's fate, declares that the Doctor is now Lord President, a position he cannot refuse. The Doctor tells Flavia to return to the Citadel as he will follow shortly, then quickly departs with his companions, as he has no intention of returning to Gallifrey any time soon. Tegan asks if he's planning to jet off across the galaxy in an old spaceship running from his people. With a grin, he replies that of course he is, as that's how his adventure started in the first place.

Production
The working title for this story was The Six Doctors. It would have been written by former script editor Robert Holmes and would have featured the Cybermen and their kidnapping of the five incarnations of the Doctor; in their attempt to extract Time Lord DNA to turn themselves into "Cyberlords", the twist being that the First Doctor and Susan would actually be android impostors (the former being the "Sixth Doctor" of the title) and the Second Doctor would have saved the day. However, Holmes dropped out at an early stage and another former script editor, Terrance Dicks, was brought in instead. Some elements of this plotline would be reused in Holmes' own The Two Doctors (1985) and in Chris Chibnall's "The Timeless Children" (2020).

The programme is officially a co-production with the Australian Broadcasting Corporation, although the production team were not aware of this during production and the agreement in effect amounted to little more than a pre-production purchase pact. Nathan-Turner's first choice of director for the story was Waris Hussein, who had directed the first-ever Doctor Who serial, An Unearthly Child, in 1963. However, Hussein was in America at the time and was unable to accept the offer. Nathan-Turner then asked another veteran director, Douglas Camfield, to direct but he also declined. Camfield was also very ill with heart disease, and this may have affected his decision not to direct the production. He died of a heart attack early in 1984.

The original script featured an appearance by the Autons, last seen in Terror of the Autons (1971). After being dropped into the Death Zone, Sarah would have been attacked by a group of them before being rescued by the Third Doctor. However, due to budgetary restrictions, the scene was dropped and replaced in the finished version. Just before she meets the Third Doctor, Sarah falls a few feet down what fans have generally considered a rather unconvincing slope. In the novelisation, Sarah actually steps off a cliff. This was what was originally intended in the script, but for budgetary reasons the sequence was changed.

Location filming took place at Cwm Bychan, Llanbedr. The Yeti costume used in the serial was last used in The Web of Fear in 1968. It had decayed badly in 15 years of storage, requiring dim lighting and selective camera angles during filming.

The story was prepared in two formats: the ninety-minute version and a four-part version, the latter designed for international distribution or repeat broadcasting in the ordinary series run. The episode breaks were, respectively, Sarah falling down the slope, the Cybermen placing their bomb outside the TARDIS while Susan and Turlough watch, and the Master appearing behind the First Doctor and Tegan while in the Dark Tower. This is the only programme from the classic series of Doctor Who for which all recorded and filmed material, including alternative and unused takes, fluffed scenes and so forth, still exists in broadcast-quality format. This allowed for the creation of the 1995 version of the story. The Five Doctors was recorded in four-channel stereo, but broadcast in mono. The later DVD releases had a Dolby Digital 5.1 soundtrack.

In the various publicity photos of the five Doctors from this story, a waxwork model of Tom Baker from a 1980 Doctor Who Exhibition in Madame Tussauds was used. According to producer John Nathan-Turner, Baker had agreed to do the photocall for the 20th anniversary but, suspecting that he might not turn up, Nathan-Turner arranged for the waxwork to be on location.

The end credits featured a specially-mixed version of the theme music, which began with Delia Derbyshire's original 1960s arrangement and then segued into the Peter Howell arrangement being used by the series at the time (the former being played at a slightly higher speed to match the tempo and pitch of the latter). This arrangement was only used on this one occasion and was the last time that the Derbyshire version was heard during the show's original run. A unique arrangement of the opening credits music was also used, which ended in a brief coda phrase that was never used in any other serial.

Cast notes
The First Doctor was played by Richard Hurndall, replacing William Hartnell, who died in 1975. Hartnell does make an appearance, however, in a pre-titles clip taken from the end of The Dalek Invasion of Earth (1964). After initially agreeing to take part, Tom Baker declined to return so soon after his departure from the series two years before, saying in 2014, "I didn't want to play 20 per cent of the part. I didn't fancy being a feed for other Doctors—in fact, it filled me with horror." His appearance was pieced together with footage from the unaired serial Shada.

In early drafts of the script, some of the Doctor and companion combinations were different. Originally, the Fourth Doctor would have been paired with Sarah Jane Smith, the Third Doctor with Brigadier Lethbridge-Stewart and the Second Doctor with Jamie McCrimmon. When Frazer Hines, Jamie's actor, proved unavailable for more than a cameo appearance the script had to be altered, pairing the Second Doctor with Victoria Waterfield. This was revised again when Deborah Watling, Victoria's actress, became unavailable and Baker decided not to appear, resulting in the pairings as they were screened. Instead of meeting phantoms of Jamie and Zoe (Wendy Padbury), the Second Doctor and the Brigadier were originally scripted to meet Zoe and Victoria. The Doctor would have realised the truth about them when Victoria called Lethbridge-Stewart "Brigadier", when she only knew him as a Colonel (in The Web of Fear). Deborah Watling was unable to make the recording dates but Frazer Hines was able to free himself up for a day's shooting, so Jamie was written in instead.

John Levene was invited back as Sergeant Benton but objected to the script requiring Benton to not recognise the Second Doctor. Levene felt this was unfaithful to his character, who he felt would not forget the Second Doctor, and he declined to participate. The scene was filmed with a character introduced as Colonel Crichton in his place.

In April 2013, Carole Ann Ford revealed the producer had initially insisted that Susan not refer to the Doctor as her grandfather: "You will not believe why. They said, 'We don't really want people to perceive him as having had sex with someone, to father a child.' I just screamed with hysterical laughter and said, 'In that case, I'm not doing it.'" The script was changed to include mentions of the characters' relationship.

Broadcast and reception

The Five Doctors was first broadcast in the United States on the actual date of the programme's 20th anniversary. The broadcast in the United Kingdom was delayed two days so it could coincide with the BBC's Children in Need charity night, with an outro in character by Peter Davison. There were a few segments in the BBC broadcast that had not been shown in the US airing.

A four-part-serial version of the story was shown on BBC One, nightly between 14 August and 17 August 1984 at 6:15 p.m., achieving viewing figures of 4.7, 4.5, 3.7 and 4.8 million, respectively.

Paul Cornell, Martin Day and Keith Topping wrote of the special in The Discontinuity Guide (1995), "A fine anniversary tale, although don't analyse the plot too closely as it's largely a collection of set pieces without a great deal of substance. This is Terrance Dicks' loving tribute to a series that he helped to mould and, as such, contains everything that it should." In The Television Companion (1998), David J. Howe and Stephen James Walker stated that The Five Doctors "is not as bad as it could have been ... [but] the story fairly groans at the seams with the inclusion of so many 'old favourites'." Still, they felt that it worked as a one-off fun celebration.

In 2012, Patrick Mulkern of Radio Times found the serial fun and made with a lot of love, though he noted the Third Doctor and Sarah Jane fared less well than some of the others. He also called it "Anthony Ainley's most effective outing" and praised the efficient scripting and other aspects of production aside from Moffatt's "sedate" direction. DVD Talk's Stuart Galbraith gave the story four out of five stars, finding Hurndall's performance as the First Doctor "the show's biggest, most delightful surprise". Writing for io9, Alasdair Wilkins said that the special was "far from perfect" and "a big, silly adventure", but worked "much better if you can selectively switch your brain off". Digital Spy's Morgan Jeffery gave the story three out of five stars, writing that it was "not the show's finest hour" but adding that it was "fun if enjoyed in the right frame of mind."

Commercial releases

In print

A novelisation of this serial, written by Terrance Dicks, was published by Target Books in November 1983; it was the only Target novelisation to be published before its story was aired. The novelisation features numerous deleted scenes that subsequently turned up on the special-edition DVD release of this story.

Home media
The Five Doctors was first released on VHS and Betamax in September 1985, accidentally using the slightly shorter version sold to the USA.  In 1990, the story was re-released, on VHS only, using the original UK broadcast edit. This version was also released on US LaserDisc in 1994.

A Special Edition of the episode (originally called the Collector's Edition), with updated special effects, surround-sound compatibility and an alternate editing of the raw material was released on VHS in 1995 in a box set with the video of The King's Demons and a limited-edition postcard album. This version also features a special BBC video ident, showing said ident being whisked away by the Time Scoop. The Special Edition was the first Doctor Who story to be released on DVD, on 1 November 1999. The Region 1 version has a commentary track by Peter Davison and writer Terrance Dicks. This would later be carried over to the 2008 re-release in Region 2.

On 22 August 2005 it was announced that The Five Doctors would be the first Doctor Who story to be made available to download to mobile phones, in a deal between BBC Worldwide and the technology firm Rok Player. The story was re-released as a 25th anniversary edition DVD on 3 March 2008. This release contains both the original broadcast version and the special edition. The special was a free gift in issue 4 of Doctor Who DVD Files.

On 28 August 2015, The Five Doctors was released in Germany—with the German title Die Fünf Doktoren.

Special Edition differences
There are many differences between the original version of the episode and the special-edition version. They are:
 Several scenes have been extended with previously unused footage. Some scenes also have new musical cues.
 Some scenes are re-ordered to match the original script.
 At the beginning there are added scenes of the Dark Tower's exterior and interior.
 The Time Scoops' black triangles have been replaced with a new effect, resembling an upside-down whirlwind.
 The Time Scoop sent to capture the Fourth Doctor turns black before capturing him, visibly indicating a malfunction.
 Thunder sound effects have been added to the scenes of the First Doctor trapped in the mirror-maze as well as to the scene of him outside the front gate.
 There is a visual-effect added onto the Dalek in the mirror-maze after it is struck by its own weapon to suggest intensifying heat prior to it exploding.
 The Dark Tower slowly becomes visible through the destroyed wall panel after the Dalek explodes.
 All beam effects, including the boobytrapped checkerboard floor, have been redone.
 The effect of the Fifth Doctor and the phantoms fading away have been altered to look less similar.
 The image and visual effect of the Fourth Doctor stuck in the time-vortex has been changed: it no longer includes Romana.
 Rassilon's voice has been altered to sound more dramatic.
 The last scene of the Fourth Doctor returned to his proper place in space and time has been changed to a different clip from Shada.
 The scene at the end in which the various Doctors depart in their TARDISes has been replaced with "Time Scoops" departing instead.
 Whilst the Fifth Doctor and the Master are talking (having just met), the Cyberman who catches sight of them no longer says "Ah!" to himself.
 The music, dialogue and sound effects are re-mixed in stereo, with two exceptions: The pre-credits clip of William Hartnell, and the Delia Derbyshire arrangement of the theme tune during the first half of the credits. These were left in mono for stylistic reasons.

Soundtrack

The complete original and special edition scores, as well as a selection of effects by Dick Mills was released on 14 September 2018. It was also released on 2-LP 28 September 2018, omitting the effects.

Track listing

See also
The Three Doctors
The Two Doctors
Dimensions in Time
"The Day of the Doctor"
"Twice Upon a Time"
"Fugitive of the Judoon"
"The Power of the Doctor"
The Five(ish) Doctors Reboot

References

External links

Script to Screen: The Five Doctors, by Jon Preddle (Time Space Visualiser issue 43, March 1995)

Target novelisation

First Doctor serials
Second Doctor serials
Third Doctor serials
Fourth Doctor serials
Fifth Doctor serials
Doctor Who multi-Doctor stories
Doctor Who serials novelised by Terrance Dicks
Cybermen television stories
The Master (Doctor Who) television stories
Dalek television stories
1983 British television episodes
Doctor Who charity episodes
1983 television films
1983 films
Anniversary television episodes